In aviation, an air traffic service (ATS) is a service which regulates and assists aircraft in real-time to ensure their safe operations. In particular, ATS is to:
 prevent collisions between aircraft; provide advice of the safe and efficient conduct of flights;
 conduct and maintain an orderly flow of air traffic;
 notify concerned organizations of and assist in search and rescue operations. 

The ATS further provides four services:
 air traffic control services, which is to prevent collisions in controlled airspace by instructing pilots where to fly;
 air traffic advisory service, used in uncontrolled airspace to prevent collisions by advising pilots of other aircraft or hazards;
 flight information service, which provides information useful for the safe and efficient conduct of flights;
 alerting service, which provides services to all known aircraft.

An ATS route is a designated route for channeling the flow of traffic as necessary for the provision of air traffic services. This include jet routes, area navigation routes (RNAV), and arrival and departure route. Routes may be defined with a designator; a path to and from significant points; distance between significant points; reporting requirements; and the lowest safe altitude.

List of service providers

Europe 

Recently European ATS service providers are facing a greater change on the European market, with the introduction of Single European Sky, that divides Europe into "functional airspace blocks" – which is replacing the old, national airspace blocks.

References

External links 
 CASA Part 172 - Air traffic service providers  Civil Aviation Safety Authority Australia
 NATS - A global leader in air traffic control and airport performance NATS Holdings
 Air Traffic Services Federal Aviation Administration of U.S.
 Air Traffic Service Providers - Entry Control Procedures Manual Civil Aviation Safety Authority Australia
 Air traffic services centres  Airservices Australia
 Air-Traffic-Controller careers  Airservices Australia

Air traffic management